Robert James (28 March 1924 – 31 July 2004) was a British actor, who was best known for his television work.

Born in Paisley, Scotland, Robert James trained to be a lawyer, before being spotted by a professional director while performing in amateur dramatics.

Although a handful have survived, many of James' television performances were amongst those discarded by UK broadcasters throughout the 1960s and 70s, including his iconic role as Lesterson in The Power of the Daleks, which now only exists as still photographs and audio recordings.

Marriage
He was married to actress Mona Bruce (1924-2008) until his death; they had one child. Clair Mcallister

Death
Robert James died in 2004, aged 80, from Alzheimer's disease in Middlesex, England.

Credits

References

External links
 

1924 births
2004 deaths
Deaths from Alzheimer's disease
Deaths from dementia in England
Male actors from Paisley, Renfrewshire
Scottish male film actors
Scottish male television actors